The Jiangshan dialect (江山話) is a Southern Wu dialect, closely related to that of Quzhou. It is spoken in Jiangshan, a city in Quzhou prefecture, China.

Phonology

Initials

Finals

Tones

The Jiangshan dialect is considered to have eight tones. However, since tone split from Middle Chinese, each character still depends on the voicing of the initial consonant. These constitute just three phonemic tones: pin, shang, and qu. (Ru syllables are phonemically toneless, as their distinctiveness lies in a final glottal stop.)

 

Wu Chinese